The Caixa Económica de Cabo Verde is a Cape Verdean commercial bank. Its headquarters are at Avenida Cidade de Lisboa in Praia. It was established in 1928 as Caixa Económica Postal. In 1985 it was transformed into an autonomous financial institution named Caixa Económica de Cabo Verde. In 1993 it became a limited liability company.

See also
List of companies in Cape Verde

References

External links
Caixa Económica de Cabo Verde's Official website

Banks of Cape Verde
Companies based in Praia
1920s establishments in Cape Verde